Roy Guest (13 March 1934 – 23 September 1996) was a folk singer and impresario.

Born in Izmir, Turkey, Guest came to prominence in the 1960s as a promoter with Harold Davison, and with Brian Epstein's NEMS enterprises. He oversaw the London concert debuts of Simon and Garfunkel, the Incredible String Band and Fairport Convention. He was also an agent during the early careers of Al Stewart and Sandy Denny. Guest was also co-founder, with Jim Haynes (of the Traverse Theatre), of the Howff folk music club in Edinburgh. Notably Bert Jansch started his career at the club which became a meeting place for folk musicians including Archie Fisher and Owen Hand, and the folk duo of Robin Hall and Jimmie Macgregor.

Guest died in Faversham, Kent in September, 1996, at the age of 62.

References

External links 
 Obituary - The Independent
 The Howff to Hip Hop by Dave Irving (2013) pp28-30

1934 births
1996 deaths
Turkish folk singers
Musicians from İzmir
British folk singers
20th-century British male singers